Industrial Cape Breton is a geographic region in the Canadian province of Nova Scotia.  It refers to the eastern portion of Cape Breton County fronting the Atlantic Ocean on the southeastern part of Cape Breton Island.

https://novascotia.ca/news/release/?id=20221202003

Geography
The area comprising Industrial Cape Breton includes the following communities within the Cape Breton Regional Municipality and earned its name from the various industrial activities relating to steelmaking, heavy water production, coal mining, and spin-off industries.

Northside
Referring to the north side of Sydney Harbour.

 northeastern tip of Boularderie Island at Point Aconi
 Bras d'Or
 Florence
 Sydney Mines
 North Sydney

Southside
 Sydney
 New Victoria
 South Bar
 New Waterford
 Lingan
 Dominion
 Glace Bay
 Reserve Mines
 Donkin
 Port Morien
 Broughton

History

Early mining

The southeastern part of Cape Breton Island is home to the Sydney Coal Field, an extensive underground coal seam extending at an angle from the shore beneath the seafloor of the Cabot Strait. This large deposit of high-sulphur coal was first extracted by French soldiers from Fortress of Louisbourg in 1720 at nearby Port Morien. A major coal industry developed during the 19th century, becoming the largest energy project in British North America at its height of production. The largest integrated steel mill in the British Commonwealth was constructed on Sydney Harbor in 1901.

The coal and steel industries went into decline following World War II and never fully recovered. They were nationalized by the federal and provincial governments during the late 1960s with the intention of closing them by the 1980s, however production increased in the 1970s as a result of rising world oil and steel prices. By the 1990s, environmental degradation (see Sydney Tar Ponds) and economic ruin was facing the industrial Cape Breton region. The steel mill and last coal mine were closed in 2001 and the area has been struggling to adapt.

While the urban area of eastern Cape Breton County influenced by the coal and steel industries came to be referred to as "Industrial Cape Breton", many rural communities in the rest of Cape Breton Island have been relatively stable economically, largely due to the mix of fishing, forestry, small-scale agriculture, and a growing tourism industry as a result of the spectacular scenery found throughout the island.

General Mining Association

In 1826 all mining rights in Nova Scotia were transferred from the Duke of York to a monopoly named the General Mining Association.  The GMA developed some mines in the Eastern Cape Breton but mostly concentrated on the mainland part of Nova Scotia.  In 1858, the GMA's monopoly was broken and many American-financed mining companies were developed in the area, particularly in Glace Bay, New Waterford, Sydney Mines and surrounding areas.

SCOTIA and DOMCO
In the 1890s, two large conglomerates were formed; the Dominion Coal Company (DOMCO) merged all the mines on the south side of Sydney Harbour and built the Sydney & Louisburg Railway with its headquarters in Glace Bay, to transport coal from the mines to the ports at Sydney and Louisbourg. At its high point, the Dominion Coal Company operated eleven mines in the town of Glace Bay which were responsible for forty percent of Canada's coal production. The GMA was transformed into Nova Scotia Steel and Coal Company (SCOTIA) and developed mines on the north side of Sydney Harbour. In 1899, DOMCO financed the construction of a large integrated steel mill in Sydney's Whitney Pier neighbourhood, which was named Dominion Iron and Steel Company (DISCO); the DISCO mill smelted iron ore mined in Bell Island, Newfoundland.  SCOTIA also built a steel mill in Sydney Mines.  The booming economy in the Industrial area experienced immigration from Newfoundland and Eastern Europe to fuel the labour demand.

BESCO
In 1914 the SCOTIA steel mill was closed and in 1920 both DOMCO/DISCO and SCOTIA were merged into a new company named British Empire Steel and Coal Company (BESCO).

The copyright of this section might be in question and is likely from UMWA material.

DOSCO
BESCO was reorganized in 1930 as Dominion Steel and Coal Corporation (DOSCO).  At one point, DOSCO was the largest private employer (in terms of the number of employees) in the nation.  While employment in coal and steel peaked in 1913 in the industrial Cape Breton area, production increased until the early 1940s as a result of mechanization and increased consumption during World War II.  Following the war, coal production went into a decline as newer and cheaper open-pit mines were opened in western North America, railways switched to diesel fuel for locomotives, and nuclear energy and hydroelectricity gained increased acceptance.

In the mid-1960s, DOSCO fell into financial difficulty as coal and steel usage continued to decline.  DOSCO announced that its mines had 15 years of production left and that its steel mill was uneconomic to operate without significant modernization.  In 1965–1966, a federal Royal Commission of Inquiry called the "Donald Commission" recommended that the federal government create a Crown corporation to take over operation of DOSCO mines with the aim being to gradually wean the industrial area economy off natural resources and into a more diversified service-oriented economy.

DEVCO and SYSCO
On July 7, 1967 the Cape Breton Development Corporation (DEVCO) was created and on March 30, 1968 all DOSCO mines were expropriated for $12 million by DEVCO.  At the same time, the provincial government formed the Sydney Steel Corporation (SYSCO) and took over DOSCO's steel mill, with the aim being to gradually control the shut down of this industry.

DEVCO brought in new tourism initiatives throughout Cape Breton Island and funded various community economic development programs, however politics and other factors such as the 1973 oil crisis brought about by the OPEC embargo following the Yom Kippur War saw demand for coal increase dramatically, particularly for electrical generation.  The federal government reversed course and chose to expand, rather than retract, the production of coal and opened new mines and modernized its DOSCO-inherited properties to serve new electrical generating stations.  It is significant to note that until 1992, Nova Scotia Power was a crown corporation, and as such treated locally produced coal with preference. During the 1980s the provincial government also modernized the steel mill, however both coal and steel encountered production and financial difficulties in the 1990s and DEVCO and SYSCO both decommissioned their operations by the turn of the century or shortly thereafter.  The last underground coal mine on Cape Breton Island closed in November 2001.

Post-industrial phase
Industrial Cape Breton's economy faces significant challenges with unemployment and out-migration, as well as ongoing efforts to clean up the Sydney Tar Ponds; a legacy of DOSCO, and later DEVCO, producing coke to fuel the blast furnaces at the steel mill.  The Muggah Creek estuary opening onto Sydney Harbour near the coke ovens site is contaminated with a variety of coal-based wastes. After extensive public consultation and technical study, a CDN$400-million cleanup plan, jointly funded by the federal and provincial governments awaits further environmental assessment.

In a classic case of adjustment from an industrial to post-industrial economy, the region is forecast to undergo a rapid depopulation as workers with limited skills and financial means are migrating to Alberta energy projects or Ontario and U.S. urban centres, while young people and entrepreneurs are leaving due to the shrinking population and lack of economic opportunity left in the void.  It has been projected that the Cape Breton Regional Municipality will depopulate from 100,000 residents in 2006 to approximately 75,000 by 2020.

Currently there are no coal mining operations on Cape Breton Island, aside from numerous bootleg mines . Record world energy prices during 2004-2005 resulted in plans to reopen an abandoned colliery at Donkin. Xstrata Coal, a subsidiary of Switzerland's Xstrata Plc Group, was awarded the right to develop the Donkin colliery by the provincial government, and re-opened the mine in 2017, however due to several Cave-ins the mine closed in 2020. The Donkin project had been estimated by promoters that it would create hundreds of jobs for Industrial Cape Breton.  It is also envisioned that the Donkin project would help improve the fortunes of the Cape Breton and Central Nova Scotia Railway, whose railway line from Port Hawkesbury to Sydney has been unprofitable since the closure of the coal mines and steel plant.

References

Further reading

Geography of the Cape Breton Regional Municipality
History of the Cape Breton Regional Municipality
Miners' labour disputes in Canada
Geographic regions of Nova Scotia